Leonid Molodozhanyn, known as Leo Mol,  (January 15, 1915 – July 4, 2009) was a Ukrainian Canadian stained glass artist, painter and sculptor.

History
Born Leonid Molodozhanyn in Polonne, Russian Empire (now Ukraine),  Mol learned the art of ceramics in his father's pottery workshop. Mol studied sculpture at the Leningrad Academy of Arts from 1936 to 1940.

Following the German invasion of the Soviet Union he was deported to Germany where he was influenced by Arno Breker. In 1945, he moved to The Hague, and in December, 1948, he and his wife, Margareth (whom he married in 1943), emigrated to Winnipeg, Manitoba. In 1949, he held his first ceramics exhibition in Winnipeg.

Mol was known for his sculptures of square dancers, skiers, aboriginals, and wildlife. Mol also completed more than 80 stained-glass windows in churches throughout Winnipeg.

More than three hundred of Mol's works are displayed in the 1.2 hectare Leo Mol Sculpture Garden in Winnipeg's Assiniboine Park which comprises a gallery, a renovated studio, and an outdoor display.  The garden was unveiled on June 18, 1992 and has been expanded twice since.  It is supported by private donations, and Mol personally donated 200 bronze sculptures to the city of Winnipeg. The sculptures are of religious leaders, prominent people, the human form, and wildlife. 

Mol died July 4, 2009, at St. Boniface Hospital in Winnipeg, Manitoba.  He was 94.

Works

In 2002, his monumental bronze sculpture Lumberjacks (1990), which now stands in Assiniboine Park was featured on a 48¢ Canadian postage stamp in the sculptors series. Mol's small bronze sculpture of lumberjacks (1978) was his inspiration for a monumental bronze sculpture.

He was always known as a particularly prolific artist and some of his most famous works include likenesses of three different Popes which stand in museums in the Vatican.  He also has a sculpture of Taras Shevchenko on display on Washington's Embassy Row.

Other important subjects who Mol sculpted include members of the Group of Seven, A. J. Casson, A.Y. Jackson and Frederick Varley. Mol also sculpted Sir Winston Churchill 1966, Winnipeg editorial cartoonist Peter Kuch (1917-1980), Dwight D. Eisenhower 1965, John F. Kennedy 1969, Elizabeth Bradford Holbrook ca. 1970, Terry Fox 1982. On Parliament Hill in Ottawa stands his impressive over life-size standing portrait figure of Prime Minister John Diefenbaker 1985 Also on Parliament Hill stands an impressive bronze statue of Elizabeth II.
The maquette of Sir William Stephenson C.C. (code-named "Intrepid") is displayed in a place of honour within CIA Headquarters, Langley, VA, USA

Honours 
In 1989, he was made an Officer of the Order of Canada. In 2000, he was awarded the Order of Manitoba. He was a member of the Royal Canadian Academy of Arts.

He received honorary degrees from the University of Winnipeg, the University of Alberta and the University of Manitoba.

Mol was also made an honorary academician of the Canadian Portrait Academy (Hon. CPA) in 2000.

Leo Mol's papers are held by the University of Manitoba Archives and Special Collections.

References

External links
The Ukrainian Weekly article:The extraordinary success story of sculptor Leo Mol
Bronze sculptor Leo Mol dies at 94, remembered for his passion for art, Winnipeg
Leo Mol biography
Watch Leo Mol in Light and Shadow at NFB.ca
Stained Glass in the Cathedral of Sts. Vladimir and Olga in Winnipeg. Winnipeg, Manitoba, 1977.
University of Manitoba Archives and Special Collections, Leo Mol fonds

1915 births
2009 deaths
Canadian male sculptors
Officers of the Order of Canada
Members of the Order of Manitoba
Members of the Royal Canadian Academy of Arts
Soviet emigrants to Canada
Ukrainian emigrants to Canada
Ukrainian sculptors
20th-century sculptors
Soviet World War II forced labourers
People from Khmelnytskyi Oblast
People from Volhynian Governorate
Artists from Winnipeg
Canadian glass artists